The Golden Touch is a Walt Disney Silly Symphony cartoon made in 1935. The story is based on the Greek myth of King Midas, albeit updated into a Medieval setting.

Plot
The extremely rich King Midas never cares for women nor wine, and he never gets enough of his gold, wishing that one day, everything he touched would turn to gold. An elf named Goldie appears beside him and offers him the Golden Touch, demonstrating its magical powers by turning Midas's cat to gold, and then clapping his hands and snapping his fingers to change it back. Midas tries to offer everything he owns in exchange, but he is warned by Goldie that the Golden Touch will prove a golden curse. Midas derides this by exclaiming, "Fiddlesticks! Give me gold! Not advice!" So Goldie gives him the Golden Touch.

At first, Midas is happy with his newfound power. He turns his cat and several things in his garden to gold. Then he talks to himself in his mirror about turning the Earth, and then the universe, to gold. But then he finds out that he can neither eat nor drink anymore. Even his bite turns a roasted chicken to gold. Deprived of his food and fearing starvation, he asks himself in his mirror, "Is the richest king in all the world to starve to death?" His reflection in his mirror hallucinates into a golden skeleton and answers him “yes” in reply to his question.

Horrified, Midas tries to flee the castle, but as he approaches the castle gate, he sees his shadow morph into a golden grim reaper. Then Midas flees back to his counting room, where the cartoon started. He summons the elf, crying, "Take away this golden curse! Don’t let me starve! Take everything, my gold, my kingdom for a hamburger sandwich!" Goldie agrees to take back the Golden Touch in exchange for everything Midas possesses, including his castle, his crown (replacing it with a tin can), and even his clothes (only sparing his undergarments). In return, Midas is given the hamburger that he begged for. Instead of bemoaning his poverty, Midas (first touching the hamburger to see if Goldie kept his promise) devours the hamburger joyfully, grateful that it came with onions.

Production 

The Golden Touch was an attempt by Walt Disney to direct a cartoon, which he had not done for five years. Disney had been criticizing his cartoon directors, and decided to direct the cartoon himself. The short itself was an immediate failure. Reasons included that the short was stiff and lethargically paced, and that Midas came off as too one-dimensional and too unsympathetic for audiences to care about him. As such, Disney immediately disowned the cartoon and forbade anybody from ever bringing it up around the studio. This failure was also so hard on him that he gave up directing cartoons altogether, stepping aside to become a full-time producer.

Voice cast
 Midas: Billy Bletcher
 Goldie: Mary Moder

Home media
The short was released on December 4, 2001, on Walt Disney Treasures: Silly Symphonies - The Historic Musical Animated Classics and on Walt Disney's Timeless Tales/Wave Two/Volume Three in 2006.

References 

 
 
 The Golden Touch
 When Walt Laid a Golden Egg

1935 films
1935 short films
1930s Disney animated short films
Silly Symphonies
Films about royalty
Animated films based on classical mythology
Films directed by Walt Disney
Films produced by Walt Disney
1935 animated films
Films scored by Frank Churchill
1930s American films